Curt Berklund (June 22, 1929 – April 5, 2013) was an American administrator who served as the Director of the Bureau of Land Management from 1973 to 1977.

He died on April 5, 2013, in Greenacres, Washington at age 83.

References

1929 births
2013 deaths
Bureau of Land Management personnel
Washington (state) Republicans